Hyde Park is one of the 4 subbarrios of Hato Rey Sur, itself one of 18 barrios of the municipality of San Juan, Puerto Rico.

References

Hato Rey, Puerto Rico
Municipality of San Juan